Kishanganj  railway station serves Kishanganj city in Kishanganj district in the Indian state of Bihar. It is one of the important railway station, as it lies on the important railway lines, they are Howrah–New Jalpaiguri line, Katihar–Siliguri line, and Barauni–Guwahati line. The famous Gaisal train disaster occurred at Gaisal railway station near Kishanganj.

History 
Darjeeling Himalayan Railway extended its -wide narrow-gauge line from Siliguri to Kishanganj in 1915. The railway lines in the area started being converted to -wide  broad gauge from the early 1960s.

Amenities 
Kishanganj railway station has the following amenities: computerized railway reservation system, waiting room, free google wifi, retiring room vegetarian and non-vegetarian  refreshment room, bookstall and Government Railway Police (G.R.P) office.

Platforms
Kishanganj has two platforms and one under construction, one for Up and other for Down trains. A small platform is used for goods unloaded from freight trains. All the platforms are well connected with two foot overbridge (FOB).

Trains

Originating Train
Kishanganj - Ajmer Garib Nawaz Express

Halting Trains
New Jalpaiguri–Howrah Shatabdi Express
 New Delhi–Dibrugarh Rajdhani Express (Via New Tinsukia)
 New Delhi–Dibrugarh Rajdhani Express (Via Moranhat)
 New Delhi–Dibrugarh Rajdhani Express (Via Rangapara North)
Sir M. Visvesvaraya Terminal - Agartala Humsafar Express
New Jalpaiguri - Howrah AC Superfast Express
Lokmanya Tilak Terminus–Kamakhya AC Superfast Express
Sir M. Visvesvaraya Terminal–Kamakhya AC Superfast Express
Guwahati - New Delhi Poorvattar Sampark Kranti Superfast Express
New Jalpaiguri - MGR Chennai Central Superfast Express
New Jalpaiguri - Sealdah Superfast Darjeeling Mail
New Jalpaiguri–New Delhi Superfast Express
New Jalpaiguri–Amritsar Karmabhoomi Express
New Jalpaiguri - Udaipur City SF Express
New Jalpaiguri - Digha Paharia Express
 New Jalpaiguri - Sealdah Padatik Superfast Express
 New Jalpaiguri - Ranchi Weekly Express
New Jalpaiguri -Rajendra Nagar Capital Express
New Jalpaiguri -Malda Town Express
New Jalpaiguri - Sitamarhi Express
Silchar - Thiruvananthapuram Aronai Superfast Express
Silchar - Coimbatore Superfast Express
Silchar - Sealdah Kanchanjunga Express
Dibrugarh–Kanyakumari Vivek Express
Dibrugarh– Chennai Tambaram Express
Dibrugarh - Lokmanya Tilak Terminus Superfast Express
Dibrugarh-Lalgarh Avadh Assam Express
Dibrugarh–Kolkata Superfast Express
Dibrugarh-Howrah Kamrup Express via Guwahati
Dibrugarh–Howrah Kamrup Express Via Rangapara North
Dibrugarh - Jhajha Express
Silghat Town - Tambaram Nagaon Express
Silghat Town - Kolkata Kaziranga Express
Agartala - Deoghar Weekly Express
Agartala - Sealdah Kanchanjunga Express
New Tinsukia–Bengaluru Weekly Express
New Tinsukia–Rajendra Nagar Weekly Express
New Tinsukia - Darbhanga Jivachh Link Express
Guwahati - Jammu Tawi Lohit Express
Guwahati- Sir M. Visvesvaraya Terminal Kaziranga Superfast Express
Guwahati - Bikaner Express
Guwahati - Okha Dwarka Express
Guwahati - Barmer Express
Guwahati–Secunderabad Express
Guwahati-Jammu Tawi Amarnath Express
Guwahati - Lokmanya Tilak Terminus Express
Guwahati-Howrah Saraighat Superfast Express
Guwahati - Kolkata Garib Rath Express
Guwahati–Rajendra Nagar Capital Express
Kamakhya - Lokmanya Tilak Terminus Karmabhoomi Express.
Kamakhya - Udaipur City Kavi Guru Express
Kamakhya - Jodhpur, Bhagat Ki Kothi Express
Kamakhya - Delhi Brahmaputra Mail
Kamakhya - Dr. Ambedkar Nagar Express
Kamakhya - Ranchi Express
Kamakhya - Puri Express via Howrah
Kamakhya - Puri Express (via Adra)
Kamakhya–Gaya Express
Kamakhya–Anand Vihar Express
Kamakhya - Delhi Northeast Express
Kamakhya - Pune Express
Alipurduar - Delhi Mahananda Express
Alipurduar - Sealdah Kanchan Kanya Express
Alipurduar - Secunderabad Express
New Alipurdiar - Sealdah Teesta Torsha Express
Bamanhat - Sealdah Uttar Banga Express
Kolkata - Haldibari Tri-Weekly Express
Kamakhya-Patna Capital Express
Siliguri Junction-Balurghat Express
Siliguri Junction-Katihar Express

References

External links 
  Trains at Kishanganj railway station

Katihar railway division
Railway stations in Kishanganj district
Railway stations opened in 1915
1915 establishments in India